Tsentralna can refer to:
 Tsentralna (Dnipropetrovsk Metro), a station under construction in Dnipropetrovsk, Ukraine
 Tsentralno–Zavodska Line, a metro line in Dnipropetrovsk, Ukraine
 Central Council of Ukraine (Tsentralna Rada), revolutionary parliament of the Ukrainian People's Republic
 Central Railway Metro Station (Tsentralna), a metro station of the Sofia Metro in Bulgaria